Youssef Ben Abdel Jaoued Sbaî (يوسف سباعي, born ) is a Tunisian male weightlifter, competing in the 69 kg category and representing Tunisia at international competitions. He participated at the 2000 Summer Olympics in the 69 kg event and also at the 2004 Summer Olympics in the 69 kg event. He competed at world championships, most recently at the 2007 World Weightlifting Championships.

Major results

References

External links
 

1978 births
Living people
Tunisian male weightlifters
Weightlifters at the 2000 Summer Olympics
Weightlifters at the 2004 Summer Olympics
Olympic weightlifters of Tunisia
Place of birth missing (living people)
World Weightlifting Championships medalists
Mediterranean Games gold medalists for Tunisia
Mediterranean Games medalists in weightlifting
Competitors at the 2001 Mediterranean Games
20th-century Tunisian people
21st-century Tunisian people